During the afternoon of 7 March 2021, a series of four explosions occurred at a military barracks in the neighborhood of Nkoantoma, a district of Bata, the largest city and commercial capital of the Central African country of Equatorial Guinea. At least 107 people died, and more than 600 others were injured, while significant infrastructural damage also occurred throughout the city.

President Teodoro Obiang Nguema Mbasogo attributed the disaster to negligently stored explosives on the base that detonated after nearby farmers cleared their fields by setting them on fire.  However, human rights groups and the Associated Press have cast doubt on Obiang's theory, as there was no evidence of farming nearby.

Explosions 

Four explosions occurred at Cuartel Militar de Nkoantoma, a military base in the neighborhood of Nkoantoma, on the southeastern periphery of Bata. The first three blasts occurred in succession around 14:00 WAT (13:00 UTC), with the first being the strongest.  The fourth explosion occurred two hours after the first detonation.  Both dead and injured people were reported in several nearby parts of the city.

Casualties 
At least 107 people were killed by the explosions, and at least 613 more were injured.  The Ministry of Health declared a "health emergency" due to the presumption that there were several more people dead and missing under the rubble. Of the injured, more than 300 were admitted to the Nuevo INSESO Hospital, more than 150 at the Bata General Hospital, and more than 70 at La Paz Hospital.

Damage 

President Obiang reported that almost all of the buildings and residences in the city had suffered great damage.

A total of 243 structures appear to have either been "heavily damaged or completely destroyed", according to a preliminary analysis by the United Nations Institute for Training and Research.  About 150 families, including 648 adults and 252 children younger than 15, have been staying in temporary shelters in Bata, according to the United Nations Children's Fund (UNICEF), while others have been staying with relatives in Bata and elsewhere.

Aftermath 

In a statement  read by broadcasters of state television channel TVGE, President Teodoro Obiang Nguema Mbasogo blamed the explosions on the negligence of those in charge of protecting the munitions on the military base.  The president also stated that neighboring farmers clearing farming land by setting it alight caused the munitions to explode. In the immediate aftermath, Vice-President Teodoro Nguema Obiang Mangue traveled to the site of the explosion to assess the situation.

On 9 March, the government declared Bata a catastrophic zone and set up an initial emergency fund of 10 billion XAF (20 million USD) to address the disaster.  
It also declared three days of national mourning, with flags flying at half-mast.

The explosions scattered a significant amount of munitions into the surrounding areas, leading some people to pose with the unexploded ordnance on social media.

Investigation 

President Obiang ordered an investigation to determine the details of the disaster, the parties responsible, and the extent of the destruction.

Human rights groups, including Human Rights Watch and EG Justice, have called for an independent investigation by international experts.  They suspect that the death toll is much higher than the one being reported, based on interviews in Bata, and question the officially reported cause of the disaster, noting that other theories are in conflict with the "hasty presidential statement deflecting blame from the military".

The Associated Press also questioned the officially reported cause, and after analyzing satellite images obtained from Planet Labs, they found no signs of farming around the military base, the only signs of land clearing they found were associated with a nearby construction project, and the only signs of fire they found were centered on three buildings thought to have held the munitions.

Assistance 

President Obiang also requested international assistance in his TVGE statement.

The Spanish Foreign Minister, Arancha González Laya, responded to the request the next day, announcing that Spain would be sending humanitarian aid immediately. Members of the Spanish Technical Aid Response Team (START), including medical and humanitarian experts, arrived the next morning.

The delegation included  members of the Israel Defense Forces (IDF) Medical Corps,  the IDF Home Front Command, and  the Ministry of Health. They also brought medical equipment along with them. The delegation sent teams to support the La Paz, Bata General, and Nuevo INSESO Hospitals.

Both Human Rights Watch and EG Justice have suggested that support be sent directly to affected Equatoguineans instead of to the government, since the "high levels of corruption" in the country meant that "any aid directly disbursed to the government [is] at high risk of being looted".

See also 
 Armed Forces of Equatorial Guinea

  2002 Lagos armoury explosion
  2007 Maputo arms depot explosion
  2012 Brazzaville arms dump blasts
 List of accidents and incidents involving transport or storage of ammunition

Notes

References

External links 
 Before-and-after satellite imagery of the blast site (BBC News)
 Preliminary analysis of satellite imagery (United Nations Institute for Training and Research)

2021 in Equatorial Guinea
2021 explosions
Explosions in 2021
Explosions in Equatorial Guinea
Man-made disasters in Equatorial Guinea
March 2021 events in Africa